Pauline Murray (born Dublin, Ireland, August 30, 1922; died Kington, Herefordshire, England, December 31, 1994) was a nurse and occasional actress, and is best known for her portrayal of nurse Pauline in the leading role of the 1966 alternate history British film, It Happened Here, a hypothetical account of England in 1944/45 under German occupation.

Life and career
During the Second World War Murray qualified as a nurse and served in Manchester. In 1950 she married Dr. Richard Jobson (died 1978), a General Practitioner in New Radnor, near the Welsh border. During an award ceremony in London in 1957, her husband was approached by Kevin Brownlow, the writer and director of It Happened Here. The film journalist Derek Hill recommended Murray, whom Brownlow had not yet met, as being perfect for a role in the film - despite the fact that Murray, as far as he knew,  had never acted in film before. It now seems however she first appeared on screen as Marion, an English maid, in the Danish film Støt står den danske sømand released in 1948, telling the true story of Danish sailors who sailed with the Allied forces during the German occupation of Denmark in World War II.

 
After her part in It Happened Here, Murray never acted in film again, but she continued to appear in village plays.

References

External links 

Credits, synopsis and background to film from Milestone Film
 Image of Pauline in It Happened Here

1922 births
1994 deaths
Irish actresses
Irish nurses
Irish expatriates in the United Kingdom